Johanna Terwin (1884–1962) was a German stage and film actress. In the theatre she appeared in works by the impresario Max Reinhardt. She appeared in around twenty films during the silent and sound eras.

She was married to the Albanian-born actor Alessandro Moissi.

Selected filmography
 Laugh Bajazzo (1915)
 Cain (1918)
 The Spies (1919)
 A Thousand for One Night (1933)
 Harvest (1936)
 Flowers from Nice (1936)
 Premiere (1937)

References

Bibliography 
 J. L. Styan. Max Reinhardt. CUP Archive, 1982.

External links 
 

People from Kaiserslautern
1884 births
1962 deaths
German film actresses
German silent film actresses
20th-century German actresses
German stage actresses